Eric Higgs may refer to:
Eric Sidney Higgs (1908–1976), English archaeologist
Eric Higgs (environmental scholar) (born 1958), Canadian philosopher and ecological planner